Lakshmy Pilla (14 February 1820 – 13 February 1904), better identified as Kutti Kunju Thankachi, was an Indian composer and writer of Malayalam literature, known to be the first female poet and composer of Kerala. The daughter of Irayimman Thampi, the noted composer of Omanathinkal Kidavo and a musician at the court of Swathi Thirunal, she was the author of a number of attakathas such as Parvathiswayamvaram and Mithrasahamoksham. Sreemathy Swayamvaram and a play, Ajnathavasam.

Biography 
Kutti Kunju Thankachi, née Lakshmy Pilla, was born on 14 February 1820 at Vilavancode taluk of the Travancore state, presently in Kanyakumari district of the south Indian state of Tamil Nadu, to Irayimman Thampi and Kalipilla Thankachi. Her early education was under her father; she studied under Harippadu Kochuppilla Varrier, simultaneously learning Thiruvathira dance from her father. Her first marriage was in 1834 to Kunjan Thampan of Cherthala Varanadu Naduvilel Kovilakam but after the death of Thampan in 1851, she married again in 1861; the marriage with Kunjunni Thampan lasting a decade until his death in 1871. She had eight children, from her two marriages. She was afflicted with eye disease from her childhood, lost her eye sight completely by 1902 and died on 13 February 1904, at the age of 83.

Legacy 
Thankachi, known to be the first woman poet and composer of Kerala, wrote eighteen books comprising three attakathas, Parvathiswayamvaram, Mithrasahamoksham and Sreemathy Swayamvaram, several poems, two kurathi songs, a thullal and a play, Ajnathavasam. Noted critic, S. Gupthan Nair, has stated that Thankachi had gained popularity as a poet during her time itself and people used to visit her to read their poems to listen to her opinions. She was known to have good knowledge of Sanskrit and she composed songs in several ragas such as Kambhoji, Kalyaani, Naatta, Khamas and Surutti.

Literary contributions

Musical compositions

See also 

 List of Malayalam-language authors by category
 List of Malayalam-language authors

Notes

References

Further reading

External links 
 
 

1820 births
1904 deaths
Writers from Kerala
19th-century Indian poets
People from Kanyakumari district
Women writers (early modern)
Indian women composers
Indian women poets
Indian women dramatists and playwrights